The 2012 All England Super Series Premier was the third super series tournament of the 2012 BWF Super Series. The tournament was held in Birmingham, England from 6–11 March 2012 and had a total purse of $350,000.

Men's singles

Seeds

  Lee Chong Wei (Final)
  Lin Dan (Winner)
  Chen Long (Quarter-finals)
  Peter Gade (First round)
  Chen Jin (Second round)
  Sho Sasaki (Second round)
  Kenichi Tago (Semi-finals)
  Lee Hyun-il (Semi-finals)

Top half

Bottom half

Finals

Women's singles

Seeds

  Wang Yihan (Finals)
  Wang Xin (First round)
  Wang Shixian (Semi-finals)
  Saina Nehwal (Quarter-finals)
  Tine Baun (Quarter-finals)
  Jiang Yanjiao (Quarter-finals)
  Li Xuerui (Winner)
  Juliane Schenk (Second round)

Top half

Bottom half

Finals

Men's doubles

Seeds

  Cai Yun / Fu Haifeng (Final)
  Jung Jae-sung / Lee Yong-dae (Champions)
  Mathias Boe / Carsten Mogensen (Semi-finals)
  Ko Sung-hyun / Yoo Yeon-seong (First round)
  Chai Biao / Guo Zhendong (Quarter-finals)
  Koo Kien Keat / Tan Boon Heong (Second round)
  Muhammad Ahsan / Bona Septano (Quarter-finals)
  Hirokatsu Hashimoto / Noriyasu Hirata (Semi-finals)

Top half

Bottom half

Finals

Women's doubles

Seeds

  Wang Xiaoli / Yu Yang (Finals)
  Tian Qing / Zhao Yunlei (Winner)
  Ha Jung-eun / Kim Min-jung (Semi-finals)
  Mizuki Fujii / Reika Kakiiwa (First round)
  Miyuki Maeda / Satoko Suetsuna (Second round)
  Shizuka Matsuo / Mami Naito (Second round)
  Christinna Pedersen / Kamilla Rytter Juhl (Quarter-finals)
  Cheng Wen-hsing / Chien Yu-chin (Second round)

Top half

Bottom half

Finals

Mixed doubles

Seeds

  Zhang Nan / Zhao Yunlei (First round)
  Xu Chen / Ma Jin (Semi-finals)
  Joachim Fischer Nielsen / Christinna Pedersen (Quarter-finals)
  Tantowi Ahmad / Lilyana Natsir (Winner)
  Chen Hung-ling / Cheng Wen-hsing (Second round)
  Sudket Prapakamol / Saralee Thoungthongkam (First round)
  Lee Yong-dae / Ha Jung-eun (First round)
  Thomas Laybourn / Kamilla Rytter Juhl (Finals)

Top half

Bottom half

Finals

References

External links 
Results

2012 All England Super Series Premier
All England Super Series Premier
All England Premier
All England Super Series Premier
Sports competitions in Birmingham, West Midlands